Benyew Harrison Demott (April 2, 1889 – July 5, 1963) was a Major League Baseball pitcher who played for two seasons. He played for the Cleveland Naps from 1910 to 1911.

External links

1889 births
1963 deaths
Cleveland Naps players
Major League Baseball pitchers
Baseball players from New Jersey
Lafayette Leopards baseball players
Baltimore Orioles (IL) players
New Haven White Wings players
Sportspeople from Morris County, New Jersey